Fatih Arda İpcioğlu (born 28 September 1997) is a Turkish ski jumper and ex national record holder.

Career 
In 2017, he became the first Turkish ski jumper, who scored Continental Cup points in Erzurum; he also became the first Turkish ski jumper, who performed in the Nordic World Championships in Lahti, where he qualified in both normal hill and large hill individual events; and became the first Turkish ski jumper to perform in World Cup in Lillehammer.

In 2018, he qualified for the 2018 Winter Olympics in Pyeongchang, South Korea and became the first Olympic Turkish ski jumper.

He also became the first representative of Turkey to qualify for a competition at the Four Hills Tournament and the first to score World Cup points.

Major Tournament results

Winter Olympics

FIS Nordic World Ski Championships

FIS Ski Flying World Championships

World Cup

Standings

Individual starts

References

External links 

Living people
1997 births
Sportspeople from Erzurum
Turkish male ski jumpers
Olympic ski jumpers of Turkey
Ski jumpers at the 2018 Winter Olympics
Ski jumpers at the 2022 Winter Olympics
21st-century Turkish people